Hatfield is a suburb in Pretoria, South Africa with a high density of students as well as student accommodation due to its close proximity to the University of Pretoria's main campus.

References

Suburbs of Pretoria
University of Pretoria campus